Bardsdell Nunatak is a mainly ice-free nunatak just north of Dalziel Ridge in the Columbia Mountains of Palmer Land. It was mapped by the United States Geological Survey in 1974, and named by the Advisory Committee on Antarctic Names for Mark Bardsdell, Columbia University geologist who studied the structure of the Scotia Ridge area, 1970–71.

References
 

Nunataks of Palmer Land